HSRN may refer to:

Hereditary sensory and autonomic neuropathy
Renk Airport, South Sudan